The 1926 Fordham Rams football team was an American football team that represented Fordham University as an independent during the 1926 college football season. In its seventh and final year under head coach Frank Gargan, Fordham compiled a 3–4–1 record and outscored opponents by a total of 131 to 119.

Schedule

References

Fordham
Fordham Rams football seasons
Fordham Rams football